The men's light welterweight event was part of the boxing programme at the 1992 Summer Olympics. The weight class allowed boxers of up to 63.5 kilograms to compete. The competition was held from 30 July to 9 August 1992. 30 boxers from 30 nations competed.

Medalists

Results
The following boxers took part in the event:

First round
 Oleg Nikolaev (EUN) – BYE
 Hubert Tinge Meta (PNG) – BYE
 Héctor Vinent (CUB) def. Edwin Cassiani (COL), 27:4
 Andreas Zülow (GER) def. Kim Jae-Kyung (KOR), 12:0
 Michele Piccirillo (ITA) def. Anoushirvan Nourian (IRN), 23:5
 Jyri Kjäll (FIN) def. Sergio Rey (ESP), RSCH-1
 Lászlo Szücs (HUN) def. Trevor Shailer (NZL), 7:0
 Daniel Fulanse (ZAM) def. Abdelkader Wahabi (BEL), 13:3
 Leonard Doroftei (ROM) def. Edgar Ruiz (MEX), 24:4
 Arlo Chavez (PHI) def. James Mozez (NGR), 12:6
 Nyamaagiin Altankhuyag (MGL) def. Khamsavath Vilayphone (LAO), RSC-2
 Peter Richardson (GBR) def. Vernon Forrest (USA), 14:8
 Mark Leduc (CAN) def. Godfrey Wakaabu (UGA), 9:2
 Dillon Carew (GUY) def. Rafael Romero (DOM), 19:4
 Christopher Henry (BAR) def. Dong Seidu (GHA), DSQ-3
 Laid Bouneb (ALG) def. Saander Kumar Gollen (IND), 11:4

Second round
 Oleg Nikolaev (EUN) def. Hubert Tinge Meta (PNG), 17:2
 Héctor Vinent (CUB) def. Andreas Zülow (GER), 14:2
 Jyri Kjäll (FIN) def. Michele Piccirillo (ITA), 12:5
 Lászlo Szücs (HUN) def. Daniel Fulanse (ZAM), 15:7
 Leonard Doroftei (ROM) def. Arlo Chavez (PHI), 15:1
 Peter Richardson (GBR) def. Nyamaagiin Altankhuyag (MGL), 21:4
 Mark Leduc (CAN) def. Dillon Carew (GUY), 5:0
 Laid Bouneb (ALG) def. Christopher Henry (BAR), 17:3

Quarterfinals
 Héctor Vinent (CUB) def. Oleg Nikolaev (EUN), 26:3
 Jyri Kjäll (FIN) def. Lászlo Szücs (HUN), 9:1
 Leonard Doroftei (ROM) def. Peter Richardson (GBR) 20:7
 Mark Leduc (CAN) def. Laid Bouneb (ALG), 8:1

Semifinals
 Hector Vinent (CUB) def. Jyri Kjäll (FIN), 13:3
 Mark Leduc (CAN) def. Leonard Doroftei (ROM), 13:6

Final
 Héctor Vinent (CUB) def. Mark Leduc (CAN), 11:1

References

Light Welterweight